"Pencil Fight" was the first and only single by Atomship released in 2004 from their first and only album The Crash of '47. It was written by lead singer Derek Pardoe. A video for the song was recorded in late 2004, just before the disbanding of Atomship, while the song had decent airplay on rock radio across the country. The video can be viewed here. It was also featured on the soundtrack of NASCAR 2005: Chase for the Cup.

Track listing
Pencil Fight - 3:36

Chart positions

2004 singles
Watership Down (band) songs
2004 songs
Wind-up Records singles